René-Pierre Azria is a French businessman and philanthropist.

Personal life 
Azria holds an M.B.A. degree (magna cum laude) from École des Hautes Études Commerciales (France), a Bachelor of Mathematics from University of Paris-Jussieu and an International Management Degree from London Business School and the Stern Graduate School of New York University.

In 1993, he married fiction writer Maria Alexis Winter.

Business 
René-Pierre Azria has been Managing Director of the Blackstone-Indosuez joint-venture and President of Financière Indosuez Inc. in New York City.

He joined N M Rothschild & Sons worldwide (head of the Technology Media Telecom practice of Rothschild in the United States) in 1996 as Global Partner. During this time, he supervised the takeover of Luxxotica on Oakley.

Since 2008, Azria is the founder and CEO of the United States advisory firm Tegris LLC, a private investment bank.

Honors 
 Herbert Lehman Prize of the American Jewish Committee (2010)

References

Alumni of London Business School
HEC Paris alumni
Living people
N M Rothschild & Sons people
Year of birth missing (living people)
21st-century French philanthropists
21st-century French businesspeople